Felipe Caltran Vila Real (born 13 February 1997) is a Brazilian Paralympic swimmer. He represented Brazil at the 2016 and 2020 Summer Paralympics.

Career
Vila Real represented Brazil at the 2015 Parapan American Games and won a gold medal and a silver medal. He again represented Brazil at the 2019 Parapan American Games and won a silver medal and four bronze medals.

Vila Real represented Brazil at the 2016 Summer Paralympics. He again represented Brazil at the 2020 Summer Paralympics and won a bronze medal in the mixed 4 × 100 metre freestyle relay 49pts event.

References

1997 births
Living people
Paralympic swimmers of Brazil
Medalists at the 2015 Parapan American Games
Medalists at the 2019 Parapan American Games
Swimmers at the 2016 Summer Paralympics
Swimmers at the 2020 Summer Paralympics
Medalists at the 2020 Summer Paralympics
Paralympic medalists in swimming
Paralympic bronze medalists for Brazil
Brazilian male freestyle swimmers
Brazilian male breaststroke swimmers
Brazilian male backstroke swimmers
Brazilian male butterfly swimmers
Brazilian male medley swimmers
S14-classified Paralympic swimmers
21st-century Brazilian people